Club Deportivo Agroisa Huétor Tájar is a Spanish football team based in Huétor-Tájar, in the autonomous community of Andalusia. Founded in 1940, it plays in Tercera División RFEF – Group 9, holding home matches at Estadio Municipal Miguel Morato, with a capacity of 520 spectators.

Season to season

12 seasons in Tercera División
1 season in Tercera División RFEF

References

External links
La Preferente team profile 
Soccerway team profile

Football clubs in Andalusia
Association football clubs established in 1940
1940 establishments in Spain
Province of Granada